Basketball at the 1989 Games of the Small States of Europe was played in Cyprus between 17 and 20 May 1989.

Men's tournament

Group A

Group B

Fifth position game

Bronze medal game

Final

External links
Results at the Cyprus Basketball Federation
Malta basketball team at the GSSE
Times of Malta Archive

1989 in basketball
1989 Games of the Small States of Europe
Basketball at the Games of the Small States of Europe
Basketball in Andorra